A putto (plural putti ) is a figure in a work of art depicted as a chubby male child, usually naked and sometimes winged. Originally limited to profane passions in symbolism, the putto came to represent the sacred cherub (plural cherubim), and in Baroque art the putto came to represent the omnipresence of God. A putto representing a cupid is also called an amorino (plural amorini) or amoretto (plural amoretti).

Etymology
The more commonly found form putti is the plural of the Italian word putto. The Italian word comes from the Latin word putus, meaning "boy" or "child". Today, in Italian, putto means either toddler winged angel or, rarely, toddler boy. It may have been derived from the same Indo-European root as the Sanskrit word "putra" (meaning "boy child", as opposed to "son"), Avestan puθra-, Old Persian puça-, Pahlavi (Middle Persian) pus and pusar, all meaning "son", and the New Persian pesar "boy, son".

History

Putti, in the ancient classical world of art, were winged infants that were believed to influence human lives. In Renaissance art, the form of the putto was derived in various ways including the Greek Eros or Roman Amor/Cupid, the god of love and companion of Aphrodite or Venus; the Roman, genius, a type of guardian spirit; or sometimes the Greek, daemon, a type of messenger spirit, being halfway between the realms of the human and the divine.

Revival of the putto in the Renaissance

Putti are a classical motif found primarily on child sarcophagi of the 2nd century, where they are depicted fighting, dancing, participating in bacchic rites, playing sports, etc.

The putto disappeared during the Middle Ages and was revived during the Quattrocento. The revival of the figure of the putto is generally attributed to Donatello, in Florence in the 1420s, although there are some earlier manifestations (for example the tomb of Ilaria del Carretto, sculpted by Jacopo della Quercia in Lucca). Since then, Donatello has been called the originator of the putto because of the contribution to art he made in restoring the classical form of putto. He gave putto a distinct character by infusing the form with Christian meanings and using it in new contexts such as musician angels. Putti also began to feature in works showing figures from classical mythology, which became popular in the same period.

Most Renaissance putti are essentially decorative and they ornament both religious and secular works, without usually taking any actual part in the events depicted in narrative paintings. There are two popular forms of the putto as the main subject of a work of art in 16th-century Italian Renaissance art: the sleeping putto and the standing putto with an animal or other object.

Where putti are found
Putti, cupids, and angels (see below) can be found in both religious and secular art from the 1420s in Italy, the turn of the 16th century in the Netherlands and Germany, the Mannerist period and late Renaissance in France, and throughout Baroque ceiling frescoes. So many artists have depicted them, but among the best-known are the sculptor Donatello and the painter Raphael. The two relaxed and curious putti who appear at the foot of Raphael's Sistine Madonna are often reproduced.

They also experienced a major revival in the 19th century, where they gamboled through paintings by French academic painters, from Gustave Doré’s illustrations for Orlando Furioso to advertisements.

Iconography of the putto
The iconography of putti is deliberately unfixed, so that it is difficult to tell the difference between putti, cupids, and various forms of angels. They have no unique, immediately identifiable attributes, so that putti may have many meanings and roles in the context of art.

Some of the more common associations are:
Associations with Aphrodite, and so with romantic—or erotic—love
Associations with Heaven
Associations with peace, prosperity, mirth, and leisure

Historiography
The historiography of this subject matter is very short. Many art historians have commented on the importance of the putto in art, but few have undertaken a major study. One useful scholarly examination is Charles Dempsey's Inventing the Renaissance Putto.

Gallery

See also
 Puer Mingens – Artistic depictions of boys urinating
 Four Kumāras – A group of semi-divine sage boys in Hinduism
 Gohō dōji – Buddhist guardian deities in the form of young boys

References

External links

 Warburg Institute Iconographic Database: ca. 1,400 images of Amorini (Amoretti) in secular contexts 

Angels in art
Italian words and phrases
Renaissance art
Visual motifs
Eros
Cupid
Cherubim